Scarborough Centre is a federal electoral district in Ontario, Canada, that has been represented in the House of Commons of Canada since 1979.

The riding was created in 1976 from parts of Scarborough East, Scarborough West and York—Scarborough ridings.

It consists of the part of the Scarborough district of the City of Toronto bounded:
on the west by Victoria Park Avenue,
on the north by Highway 401,
on the east by McCowan Road, Lawrence Avenue East and Bellamy Road North, and
on the south by Eglinton Avenue East.

Notable landmarks in Scarborough Centre include:
 Scarborough Civic Centre, site of east Toronto district council meetings, and adjacent Albert Campbell Square
 Scarborough Town Centre, a large shopping mall
 Scarborough Centre Line 3 station
 Scarborough General Hospital, General Division
 Scarborough Historical Museum

It has been represented in the House of Commons by Liberal MP Salma Zahid since 2015.

Geography
The riding contains the neighbourhoods of Scarborough City Centre (west of McCowan Road), Bendale (west of McCowan and south of Lawrence), Eglinton East, Ionview (north of Eglinton Avenue), Golden Mile (north of Eglinton Avenue), Wexford, Maryvale, and Dorset Park.

History
Scarborough Centre was created in 1976. It consisted initially of the part of the Borough of Scarborough bounded on the west by Victoria Park Avenue, on the north by Ellesmere Road, on the east by Bellamy Road North, and on the south by Eglinton Avenue East.

In 1987, it was expanded to include the part of Scarborough lying bounded by Bellamy Road North, Lawrence Avenue East, Markham Road and Eglinton Avenue East.

In 1996, it was redefined such that it was bounded:
 on the west by Victoria Park Avenue,
on the north by a line drawn from west to east along Ellesmere Road, north along the Canadian National Railway and west along Highway 401,
 on the east by a line drawn from north to south along Highland Creek East, west along Ellesmere Road, south along Scarborough Golf Club Road, west along Lawrence Avenue East and south along Markham Road, and
on the south by Eglinton Avenue East.

In 2003, it was given its current boundaries as described above.

This riding lost territory to Scarborough—Guildwood, and gained territory from Scarborough Southwest during the 2012 electoral redistribution.

Members of Parliament

This riding has elected the following Members of Parliament:

Demographics 
According to the 2021 Canada Census

Ethnic groups: 28.5% South Asian, 24.8% White, 13.1% Filipino, 9.9% Black, 8.0% Chinese, 3.4% Arab, 2.7% West Asian, 1.6% Latin American, 1.2% Southeast Asian

Languages: 43.3% English, 6.6% Tamil, 6.3% Tagalog, 3.0% Mandarin, 3.0% Cantonese, 2.7% Bengali, 2.5% Arabic, 2.1% Greek, 2.1% Urdu, 1.8% Gujarati, 1.3% Spanish, 1.2% Hindi, 1.1% Dari

Religions: 48.0% Christian (23.7% Catholic, 5.7% Christian Orthodox, 1.8% Anglican, 1.5% Pentecostal, 1.3% United Church, 1.0% Baptist, 13.0% Other), 17.4% Muslim, 13.9% Hindu, 1.6% Buddhist, 17.9% None

Median income: $34,000 (2020)

Average income: $41,560 (2020)

Former boundaries

Election results

				

Note: Conservative vote is compared to the total of the Canadian Alliance vote and Progressive Conservative vote in 2000 election.

Note: Canadian Alliance vote is compared to the Reform vote in 1997 election.

See also
 List of Canadian federal electoral districts
 Past Canadian electoral districts

References

Riding history from the Library of Parliament
 2011 results from Elections Canada
 Campaign expense data from Elections Canada

Notes

Federal electoral districts of Toronto
Ontario federal electoral districts
Scarborough, Toronto
1976 establishments in Ontario